Stray Dog was Hal Crook's sixth album as a leader. It was recorded live at Club AS220 in Providence, Rhode Island, where Crook's band held a recurring Tuesday night gig for several years. Crook plays his signature "Trom-o-Tizer," which consists of a trombone with a small microphone directing its signal through a digital effects unit, allowing him to access various effects including chorus, delay, and a 5-voice digital harmonizer.

Track listing 
Bushwacker — 5:47
Gizmosis — 2:15
Walter's World — 7:15
Stray Dog (Part 1) — 9:28
Repulse Impulse — 4:41
Teen Mind — 4:52
Pervert — 9:33
Stray Dog (Part 2) — 5:53
Um — 12:38

Personnel
Hal Crook — Trom-o-Tizer
Rick Peckham — guitar
John Medeski — organ
Dave Zinno — bass
Bob Gullotti — drums

References

Hal Crook albums
2001 live albums
Ropeadope Records live albums